Henry Dreyer (4 March 1892–1953) was an English footballer who played in the Football League for Crystal Palace, Southend United and South Shields.

References

1892 births
1953 deaths
English footballers
Association football midfielders
English Football League players
Gateshead A.F.C. players
Crystal Palace F.C. players
Southend United F.C. players
Boston Town F.C. (1920s) players